Where I Find You is the second studio album release by Kari Jobe, which was released January 24, 2012, but was her first album on the Sparrow Records label. The song "We Are" is the only radio and charted hit off of the album, so far. The album has charted on three Billboard charts: No. 10 on Billboard 200, No. 1 on Christian Albums and at No. 5 on Digital Albums. All of the peak positions occurred on February 11, 2012 selling 25,000 copies in the first week. Where I Find You earned a Grammy Award nomination in 2012, making Jobe a first-time Grammy nominee.

Background
Album
Jobe said "I felt the first record needed to be peaceful and more acoustic sounding in order to help people connect with God through it. This time around, I really wanted it to be a bigger sound and more driving in the music...the songs actually require a stronger drum and musical presence to support the lyrics."

We Are
The song "We Are", Jobe stated that "this song comes out of Matthew 5 where Jesus says, 'You are the light of the world. A city on a hill that CANNOT be hidden...It's Jesus that shines through us. I don't have to shine or be good at it; Jesus is good at what He does and when were surrendered to Him, we will minister to people around us...I think sometimes we feel the Lord asking us to step outside of our own comfort zone and minister to someone, or share a word of encouragement with them. This is always fun and adventurous and so life-giving to you and the person receiving ministry. The Lord just wants to work through us and use us to minister."

Reception

Critical

Allmusic's Matt Collar said "Where I Find You, features more of the inspirational artist's melodic Christian pop." In addition, Collar wrote that "this is bright, positive-minded, and uplifting modern CCM." Collar cited the songs of "Steady My Heart", "We Are" and "Savior's Here" as his top picks selections.

All About Worship's Chris Olsen  said he has "genuinely been moved almost to the point of tears". Julie Terwilliger wrote she "definitely noticed how polished it sounded at first. Although pretty much all of the songs are congregational friendly they are also masterfully produced for a radio hit. A few creative new sounds incorporated, but not to the point that the art is more noticeable than the heart of worship expressed." Olsen highlighted "Here" as his favorite track, while Terwilliger reported hers' as "Find You on My Knees" and "Stars in the Sky".

Alpha Omega New's Rob Snyder graded the album an A, and said "the very real lyrics often have a reoccurring theme in that God is around even when 'it all just falls apart' (Steady My Heart)."

CCM Magazine'''s Grace S. Aspinwall said "all at once moving, strong and wistful, this project is breathtaking. Kari Jobe has only gotten better since her beautiful debut, and every single song on this album is incredible." Aspinwall wrote that "every single song is a winner here and we could listen all day long." They highlighted the track "One Desire" as the "WE LIKE" pick.

Christian Broadcasting Network's Craig von Buseck said "this is much more of a pop album than a traditional worship or 'soaking' album, though it is still very 'worshipful' as seen in songs such as 'Love Came Down'" von Buseck wrote "the orchestration in this album is a nice balance of lush instrumentation and straightforward pop". von Buseck noted that Jobe had a distinct voice, when he heard the album.

Christian Manifesto's Lydia Akinola said that "however, I feel that in an effort to appeal to an even wider audience, in a push for a more poppy and accessibly sound, some of the aesthetic purity that made Jobe's debut so successful has been sacrificed. The strongest points of Where I Find You are those which have developed what worked from the first project and taken it further. The closer "Here" is one such song." Akinola wrote that "nevertheless, Where I Find You is not without its bright spots. Jobe collaborated with Matt Maher performing a beautiful duet on "We Exalt Your Name" and also worked with fellow Dove winner Chris August on "Stars in the Sky".  "Find You on My Knees" is a standout track full of all the passion that Kari Jobe is famous for."

Christian Music Zine's Joshua Andre said "all in all Kari is as emotional, honest and powerful, or maybe even more so, in this album, as any other worship album in the past five years. This album touched me so much emotionally and spiritually. Kari is an excellent songwriter, and she sticks to a certain style in her album; this is what I believe sets her apart from some other worship artists. She knows her strengths and sings to it." Andre wrote that the "album is near flawless". Andre highlights the favorite tracks as being "We Are", "Savior's Here", "Stars in the Sky", "Rise", "One Desire", and "Run to You".Christianity Todays Andrew Greer said "Where I Find You raises the bar, expanding her worship sensibility and solo pop sweetness by enlisting major hooks to showcase radio-ready co-writes (with the likes of Matt Maher, Lincoln Brewster and Hillsong's Mia Feldes)." Greer wrote that "despite some sleepy clichés, Jobe's sensitive evocations make apparent her genuine worship music background." The top tracks according to Greer was "Steady My Heart," "We Are," "Find You on My Knees".

Cross Rhythms' Tim Holden said that "If you like uplifting pop done well, go get this album."

Indie Vision Music's Jonathan Andre said "the result of this realisation is 12 songs of raw passion, honesty and devotion to the God of the universe. With such moving and emotional lyrical content, Kari is able to allow the listener to encounter and experience the Lord's promises and truths upon their life, praising and exalting Him in the process." Andre wrote that "with the rise of many worship artists like Chris Tomlin, Christy Nockels, Meredith Andrews, Matt Maher, and Martin Smith; Kari Jobe stands tall with each of these musically diverse artists, with her soaring vocals and vulnerability serving as a strength in this album, about pure adoration, wonder and marvel towards the King who has won her heart. Her enthusiasm and infectious vocal ability in her songs has taken the listener, me included, on a spiritual journey like no other. This album is certainly to savour".

Jesus Freak Hideout's Jen Rose said that "Where I Find You plunges straight into the arena-filling sound of artists like Chris Tomlin and Hillsong. Piano and keys still figure greatly into her work, with guitars, strings, and big drums to amplify the emotion. Lyrically, these tracks showcase singable hooks that stick in the mind and cover a variety of themes, from looking to God in adversity and the role of the Church, to proclamations of God's holiness, mercy, and unchanging nature. A few songs take on a personal angle, but these too keep the focus vertical and the mood reverent." Rose wrote that "Overall, this is a well made, passionately delivered project and is sure to provide a few new additions to many a church leader's songbook. Still, it's worth noting that some of these songs, like the staples of most worship albums, are meant for the live experience. With the exception of a few tracks, the bulk of the record carries a highly produced 'worship sound,' and some of the bigger, longer tracks can get repetitious after a while. This is the dilemma pointed out by many critics of the genre, and it's a bit disappointing to have that 'heard it before' feeling, especially considering the beauty of her more restrained pieces or the fun of her pop radio single." Lastly, Rose said the "standout moments" are tracks "Steady My Heart" and "Find You on My Knees".

Louder Than The Music's Jono Davies said "The only negative point that I can bring out about this album is that some of tracks can seem to take the same pattern of style. When you know there is going to be a big chorus and even bigger bridge section then some songs can seem familiar in style. But even taking that small negative point into account this album has some extraordinary, strong and excellent tracks. One of the reasons you buy an album like this is because you want to hear the strong vocals of Kari Jobe and for me they have become even stronger, richer and much more delightful to listen to. Kari Jobe has made an amazing jump in quality and Where I Find You proves it." Davies noted the "standout tracks" as being "What Love Is This", "Steady My Heart" and "We Exalt Your Name".

New Release Tuesday's Sarah Fine said "Where I Find You has been well worth the wait for Kari Jobe fans. Intensely passionate and honest, this has taken Kari's artistry and elevated it to a whole new level. This is a deeper project than her 2009 debut, many of the songs coming from an openly broken place, but it's the promise of hope in the midst of that brokenness, that turns each song into a beautiful anthem of unwavering praise. Musically, while her debut hung heavily on a quirky organic sound, this effort sounds much more studio polished and matured. Some people might miss that eccentric earthiness, but regardless, it's hard not to enjoy the smooth and stirring melodies found on this project, especially when they each hold such a profound meaning."

Commercial
The album sold 25,000 copies in the first week, and this helped it achieve the spots on the 200, Christian and Digital albums charts for the week of February 11, 2012.

Track listing

 Personnel 

 Kari Jobe – lead and backing vocals 
 Matt Stanfield – programming (1, 4, 6, 9), acoustic piano (12)
 Chuck Butler – keyboards (2), programming (2), loops (2)
 Tim Lauer – keyboards (2, 3, 5, 8, 10, 11, 12)
 Ed Cash – keyboards (2), programming (2, 3, 5, 7, 8, 10, 11), acoustic guitar (2, 3, 5, 8, 10, 11), backing vocals (2, 3, 5, 8, 10), additional keyboards (12)
 Ben Shive – acoustic piano (3)
 Jeff Roach – acoustic piano (7)
 Grant Pittman – keyboards (11)
 Matt Bronleewe – guitars (1, 4, 6, 9), various random additional and supplemental sonic material (1, 4, 6, 9)
 Stephen Leiweke – guitars (1, 4, 6, 9)
 Stu G – electric guitar (2, 3, 5, 8, 10, 11)
 Chris Lacorte – electric guitar (2, 5)
 Jerry McPherson – electric guitar (2, 3, 8)
 Adam Shoenfeld – electric guitar (2, 3, 5, 8, 10)
 Hank Bentley – electric guitar (11)
 James Gregory – bass (1, 4, 6, 9)
 Tony Lucido – bass (2, 3, 5, 8, 10, 11, 12)
 Paul Mabury – drums (1-6, 8-12)
 Trent Austin – drums (11)
 Chris Carmichael – strings (1, 4, 6, 9), string arrangements (1, 4, 6, 9)
 Frances Cash – backing vocals (2)
 Cody Carnes – harmony vocals (5)
 Ryan Edgar – harmony vocals (10)
 Matt Maher – harmony vocals (11)Technical credits Stephen Leiweke – engineer (1, 4, 6, 9)
 Ed Cash – engineer (2, 3, 5, 7, 8, 10, 11, 12), mixing (7)
 Aaron Michael Brown – additional engineer 
 Steve Rokks – additional engineer 
 Scott Cash – assistant engineer (2, 3, 5, 7, 8, 10, 11, 12)
 Cody Norris – assistant engineer (2, 3, 5, 7, 8, 10, 11, 12)
 F. Reid Shippen – mixing (1-6, 8-12)
 Erik "Keller" Jahner – mix assistant (1-6, 8-12)
 John DeNosky – editing (1, 4, 6, 9)
 Ted Jensen – mastering Production credits'''

 Karrie Hardwick – A&R 
 Jess Chambers – A&R administration 
 Lani Crump – production coordinator (1, 4, 6, 9)
 Dave Steunebrink – production coordinator (1, 4, 6, 9)
 Jan Cook – art direction 
 Kari Jobe – art direction 
 Alena Moore – art direction
 Sean Mosher-Smith – design 
 Jessica Sheppard – back and cover photography 
 Reid Rolls – inside photography 
 Kristen Pate – additional insert photos 
 Anna Redmon – additional insert photos 
 Juliana Parrish – hair (cover)
 Chelsie Birks – make-up (cover)
 Kris Laymon – stylist (cover)

Charts

Album

Singles

References

External links
 Allmusic

2012 albums
Kari Jobe albums
Sparrow Records albums
Albums produced by Matt Bronleewe